The 2023 Nigerian gubernatorial elections will be held for state governors in 31 out of 36 Nigerian states. All but three elections will be held on 18 March—concurrent with elections to every state house of assembly, three weeks after the presidential election and National Assembly elections—while the Imo State, Kogi State, and Bayelsa State elections will be held on 11 November. The last regular gubernatorial elections for all states were in 2019. All states have a two term limit for Governors which makes 18 incumbent governors ineligible for re-election.

Results summary

Notes

Abia State 

Incumbent PDP Governor Okezie Ikpeazu was re-elected to a second term in 2019 with 60.26% of the vote. He will be term-limited in 2023 and cannot seek re-election for a third term.

Primaries 
For the APC, two parallel primaries were held with one faction holding an indirect primary at the Chidiebere Arena while the other faction held a direct primary (citing a national APC directive for a direct primary in Abia) that carried on into the next day. After both primaries were peacefully held, the Chidiebere Arena primary ended in economist Ikechi Emenike winning by a wide margin while the direct primary resulted in a victory for former minister Uche Ogah. INEC recognised Emenike as the legitimate nominee in July 2022 after a court ruled in his favour.

In the APGA primary, Gregory Ibe (an academic administrator) defeated his three opponents with around 54% of the delegates' votes. While the party accepted his nomination, second runner-up Ijioma Nwokoro Ijioma rejected the results.

In the PDP primary, Uche Ikonne (an optometrist and academic administrator) emerged victorious after almost all of his opponents withdrew on the day of the primary. Reasons for withdrawal were split between those claimed that Ikpeazu's tacit support for Ikonne along with doctored delegate lists removed any fairness from the primary and those that dropped out to support Ikonne. Ikonne defeated the two remaining candidates with over 80% of the vote in an indirect primary on 25 May.

Adamawa State 

Incumbent PDP Governor Ahmadu Umaru Fintiri was elected to a first term in 2019 with 43.22% of the vote. He is eligible to run for re-election and has been renominated by his party.

Primaries 
For the APC, Aishatu Dahiru Ahmed—Senator for Adamawa Central—won the primary with 42% of delegates' votes. Despite some controversies during the primary, Ahmed was accepted as the nominee and made history as the first women to nominated by a major party for the Adamawa governorship and only the second women ever nominated by a major party for any state governorship.

In the PDP primary, Fintiri was the sole candidate due to the disqualification of his only primary opponent—Jameel Abubakar Waziri. As he was unopposed, Fintiri won unanimously at the primary in Yola.

Akwa Ibom State 

Incumbent PDP Governor Udom Gabriel Emmanuel was re-elected to a second term in 2019 with 74.64% of the vote. He will be term-limited in 2023 and cannot seek re-election for a third term.

Primaries 
For the APC, months of a party crisis between a national party-recognized faction backed by Godswill Akpabio and an INEC-recognized faction backed by John James Akpan Udo-Edehe culminated in street fights over control of official voting materials. Eventually, the Akpabio faction gained control of the materials and held its primary on 27 May with businessman Akanimo Udofia winning. However, INEC did not recognize Udofia's win, leaving the APC without a gubernatorial nominee. As the APC failed to legitimately nominate a candidate, minor parties' nominees have become major candidates as Udo-Edehe decamped to the NNPP to become its nominee with rumors that losing PDP candidates are also looking at minor parties' tickets.

In the PDP primary, Umo Eno (a former commissioner) emerged victorious after two of his major opponents—Senator Bassey Albert Akpan and MHR Onofiok Luke—withdrew on the day of the primary as both claimed that a court order prevented the primary from taking place. Eno defeated the remaining candidates with over 97% of the vote in an indirect primary on 25 May.

Bauchi State 

Incumbent PDP Governor Bala Mohammed was elected to a first term in 2019 with 46.35% of the vote. He initially declined to run for re-election, instead running for president. However, after losing the PDP presidential primary in May 2022, Mohammed was renominated for governor in a rerun primary.

Primaries  
In the APC primary, Sadique Abubakar (former Chief of the Air Staff) defeated Senator Halliru Dauda Jika with 36% of the vote in an indirect primary on 26 May. Jika left for the NNPP a few weeks after the primary.

In the PDP, former Secretary to the State Government Ibrahim Kashim won the primary unopposed on 25 May. However, prior to the primary, reporting revealed that Kashim was to act as a placeholder and would withdraw if Mohammed's presidential campaign failed. After it did, Kashim withdrew and Mohammed won the rerun primary on 4 June unopposed.

Bayelsa State 

Incumbent PDP Governor Douye Diri was elected to a first term in 2019 after a court decision. He is eligible to run for re-election, but has not yet stated whether he will do so. A rumored PDP primary challenger for Diri is former NDDC Managing Director/CEO and 2019 PDP gubernatorial candidate Timi Alaibe. 

Rumored APC candidates include Timipre Sylva (former Governor and Minister of State for Petroleum Resources), Peremobowei Ebebi (former Deputy Governor and 2020 Bayelsa West senatorial by-election nominee), David Lyon (2019 APC gubernatorial nominee), and Heineken Lokpobiri (former Minister of State for Agriculture and Rural Development and former Senator for Bayelsa West).

Benue State 

Incumbent PDP Governor Samuel Ortom was re-elected to a second term in 2019 with 52.29% of the vote. He will be term-limited in 2023 and cannot seek re-election for a third term. Dondu Ahire (former Commissioner for Water Resources and Solid Minerals), Terver Akase (Chief Press Secretary to Ortom), Robert Orya (former Managing Director/CEO of NEXIM), Titus Uba (House of Assembly member for Kyan and Speaker of the House of Assembly), Terkaa Ucha (House of Assembly member for Vandeikya-Tiev), and Paul Ubwa (BECCIMA President) are declared PDP candidates while Benson Abounu (Deputy Governor and former commissioner) and Terwase Orbunde (former Chief of Staff to Ortom) have expressed interest in contesting and suspended his campaign, respectively.

Announced APC candidates include Barnabas Andyar Gemade (former Senator for Benue North-East), Herman Hembe (House of Representatives member for Konshisha/Vandeikya), Terlumun Ikya (economic consultant) and Steven Lawani (former Deputy Governor).

Borno State 

Incumbent APC Governor Babagana Umara Zulum was elected to a first term in 2019 with 92.78% of the vote. He is eligible to run for re-election, but has not yet stated whether he will do so. Rumored APC primary challengers are 2019 APC gubernatorial candidate Kashim Ibrahim-Imam, Minister of State for Agriculture and Rural Development Mustapha Baba Shehuri, Senator for Borno North Abubakar Kyari, and Senator for Borno South Mohammed Ali Ndume. Rumored PDP candidates include 2015 PDP gubernatorial nominee Gambo Lawan and former Senator for Borno Central Mohammed Abba-Aji.

Cross River State 

Incumbent PDP-turned-APC Governor Benedict Ayade was re-elected to a second term in 2019 with 73.04% of the vote. He will be term-limited in 2023 and cannot seek re-election for a third term. A declared APC candidate is Godswill Edward Osim (Ayade aide and son-in-law of former President Goodluck Jonathan) while potential APC candidates include Chris Agara (businessman), Goddy Jedy Agba (Minister of State for Power), Okonkon Effiom (Commissioner for Rural Transformation), Asuquo Ekpenyong (Commissioner for Finance), John Owan Enoh (former Senator for Cross River Central and 2019 APC gubernatorial nominee), Ntufam Ekpo Okon (former House of Representatives member for Calabar Municipal/Odukpani and 2019 APC deputy gubernatorial nominee), Bassey Otu (former Senator for Cross River South), and Usani Uguru Usani (former Niger Delta Minister).

Announced PDP candidates are Arthur Archibong (Chancellor of Arthur Javis University), Daniel Effiong Asuquo (House of Representatives member for Akamkpa/Biase), Gershom Bassey (Senator for Cross River South), and Sandy Ojang Onor (Senator for Cross River Central) while several other politicians are rumored to be potential candidates.

Delta State 

Incumbent PDP Governor Ifeanyi Okowa was re-elected to a second term in 2019 with 80.17% of the vote. He will be term-limited in 2023 and cannot seek re-election for a third term. A rumored APC candidate is Senator for Delta Central and Senate Deputy President Ovie Omo-Agege. Announced PDP candidates are David Edevbie (former Commissioner for Finance and former Yar'Adua aide), Kenneth Gbagi (2015 PDP gubernatorial candidate and former Minister of State for Education), and Fred Majemite (former Commissioner and husband of former Ethiope West LG Chairwoman Faith Majemite) while there are multiple potential candidates including James Manager (Senator for Delta South), Kingsley Otuaro (Deputy Governor), and Sheriff Oborevwori (House of Assembly member for Okpe and Speaker of the House of Assembly).

Ebonyi State 

Incumbent PDP-turned-APC Governor Dave Umahi was re-elected to a second term in 2019 with 81.54% of the vote. He will be term-limited in 2023 and cannot seek re-election for a third term. Rumored APC candidates include 2019 APC gubernatorial candidate Edward Nkwegu, former Senator for Ebonyi Central Julius Ucha, former SSG and 2019 APC gubernatorial candidate Bernard Odoh, Chairman of the Revenue Mobilization Allocation and Fiscal Commission Elias Mbam, and former Senator for Ebonyi South and 2019 APC gubernatorial nominee Sonni Ogbuoji.

The PDP candidate is Ifeanyichukwu Odii which was confirmed by a court ruling while other aspirants candidates include  Joseph Ogba (Senator for Ebonyi Central), Edwin Anayo (House of Representatives member for Ezza North/Ishielu), Fidelis Nwankwo (former Minister of State for Health), Francis Ogbonna Nwifuru (House of Assembly member for Izzi West and Speaker of the House of Assembly), Sylvester Ogbaga (House of Representatives member for Abakaliki/Izzi), and Chris Usulor (House of Assembly member for Ezza South and son of former Senator for Ebonyi Central Vincent Obasi Usulor).

Enugu State 

PDP Governor Ifeanyi Ugwuanyi was re-elected to a second term in 2019 with 95.54% of the vote. He will be term-limited in 2023 and cannot seek re-election for a third term. A rumored APC candidate is former Senator for Enugu North and 2019 APC gubernatorial nominee Ayogu Eze. Rumored PDP candidates include Senator for Enugu West Ike Ekweremadu, former Federal Permanent Secretary Chinyeaka Ohaa, House of Representatives member for Nsukka/Igbo-Eze South Patrick Asadu, former Minister of Power Bartholomew Nnaji, House of Assembly Speaker and member for Enugu East Urban Edward Uchenna Ubosi, former Minister of Information and Communications Frank Nweke, Commissioner and former House of Representatives member for Enugu East/Isi-Uzo Chijioke Jonathan Edeoga, and former Senator for Enugu East Gilbert Nnaji.

Gombe State 

Incumbent APC Governor Muhammad Inuwa Yahaya was elected to a first term in 2019 with 59.88% of the vote. He has announced his run for re-election. A rumored PDP candidate is former Deputy Speaker of the House of Representatives, former House of Representatives member for Dukku/Nafada, and 2019 PDP gubernatorial nominee Usman Bayero Nafada.

Imo State

Jigawa State 

Incumbent APC Governor Mohammed Badaru Abubakar was re-elected to a second term in 2019 with 73.51% of the vote. He will be term-limited in 2023 and cannot seek re-election for a third term. Rumored APC candidates include Senator for Jigawa North Ibrahim Hassan Hadejia and Senator for Jigawa South-West Mohammed Sabo Nakudu among others. Rumored PDP candidates include Mustapha Sule Lamido (2019 PDP Jigawa South-West senatorial nominee and son of former Governor Sule Lamido) and former Minister of State for Foreign Affairs and 2015 PDP deputy gubernatorial nominee Nuruddeen Muhammad.

Kaduna State 

Incumbent APC Governor Nasir Ahmad el-Rufai was re-elected to a second term in 2019 with 55.32% of the vote. He will be term-limited in 2023 and cannot seek re-election for a third term. Rumored APC candidates include Muhammad Sani Abdullahi (Commissioner for Budget and Planning and former Chief of Staff to el-Rufai), Samuel Aruwan (Commissioner for Internal Security and Home Affairs), Hadiza Sabuwa Balarabe (Deputy Governor), Muhammad Hafiz Bayero (Administrator of the Kaduna Capital Territory), Suleiman Abdu Kwari (Senator for Kaduna North and former Commissioner for Finance), Ja'afaru Ibrahim Sani (Commissioner for Local Government Affairs), Uba Sani (Senator for Kaduna Central), and Hadiza Bala Usman (former Managing Director of the Nigerian Ports Authority and co-founder of the Bring Back Our Girls campaign).

Declared PDP candidates include Mohammed Sani Abbas (A barrister, businessman and financial consultant) Yusuf Datti Baba-Ahmed (former Senator for Kaduna North and former House of Representatives member for Zaria) Shehu Sani (former Senator for Kaduna Central) while the announcement of the campaign of Isah Ashiru (2019 PDP gubernatorial nominee, former House of Representatives member for Makarfi/Kudan, and former House of Assembly member for Kudan) is pending.

Kano State 

Incumbent APC Governor Abdullahi Umar Ganduje was re-elected to a second term in 2019 with 50.23% of the vote. He will be term-limited in 2023 and cannot seek re-election for a third term. Inuwa Ibrahim Waya (former Nigerian National Petroleum Corporation official), Abdussalam Abdulkarim Zaura (A.A.) Zaura (2019 GPN gubernatorial nominee), and Barau Jibrin (Senator for Kano North) have either announced or have pending announcements; on the other hand, Murtala Sule Garo (Commissioner for Local Government and Community Development) and Nasir Yusuf Gawuna (Deputy Governor) are rumored to looking at running.

For the PDP, rumored candidates are Abdullahi Baffa Bichi (former Executive Secretary of Tertiary Education Trust Fund), Muhuyi Magaji Rimingado (Chairman of Kano Public Complaints and Anti-Corruption Commission), and Abba Kabir Yusuf (2019 PDP gubernatorial nominee and former Commissioner of Works, Housing, and Transport).

Katsina State 

Incumbent APC Governor Aminu Bello Masari was re-elected to a second term in 2019 with 70.04% of the vote. He will be term-limited in 2023 and cannot seek re-election for a third term. Rumored APC candidates include Minister of Aviation Hadi Sirika, Senator for Katsina North Ahmad Babba Kaita, SMEDAN Director-General Dikko Umaru Radda, Federal Mortgage Bank of Nigeria Managing Director/CEO Ahmed Musa Dangiwa, and former House of Representatives member for Katsina Central Abubakar Sadiq Yar'adua.

Kebbi State 

Incumbent APC Governor Abubakar Atiku Bagudu was re-elected to a second term in 2019 with 84.92% of the vote. He will be term-limited in 2023 and cannot seek re-election for a third term. Rumored APC candidates include Nigeria Union of Teachers President and Nigeria Labour Congress Vice National Chairman Nasir Idris, Minister of Justice and Attorney General of the Federation Abubakar Malami, Senator for Kebbi North Yahaya Abubakar Abdullahi, and Senator for Kebbi South Bala Ibn Na'allah. For the PDP, former Army Major General Aminu Bande has announced his candidacy.

Kogi State 

Incumbent APC Governor Yahaya Bello was elected to a second term in 2019 with 66.51% of the vote. He will be term-limited in 2023 and cannot seek re-election for a third term. Potential APC candidates are Smart Adeyemi (Senator for Kogi West), Abdulkareem Jamiu Asuku (Chief of Staff to Bello), Jibrin Isah (Senator for Kogi East), Mukadam Ashiru Idris (Commissioner of Finance), and Edward David Onoja (Deputy Governor). A rumored PDP candidate is Dino Melaye, 2019 PDP gubernatorial candidate and former Senator for Kogi West.

Kwara State 

Incumbent APC Governor AbdulRahman AbdulRazaq was elected to a first term in 2019 with 73.12% of the vote. He is eligible to run for re-election, but has not yet stated whether he will do so. Rumored PDP candidates include Bolaji Abdullahi (former Minister of Sports and former Minister of Youth Development), Ali Ahmad (former House of Assembly member for Ilorin South, former Speaker of the Kwara State House of Assembly, and former House of Representatives member for Ilorin East/Ilorin South), and Abdulwahab Issa (former House of Representatives member for Ilorin East/Ilorin South).

Lagos State 

Incumbent APC Governor Babajide Sanwo-Olu was elected to a first term in 2019 with 75.65% of the vote. He is eligible to run for re-election, but has not yet stated whether he will do so. Rumored APC primary challengers to Sanwo-Olu include Tokunbo Abiru (Senator for Lagos East (2020–present) and former Commissioner for Finance), Femi Hamzat (Deputy Governor and former Commissioner for Science and Technology), and Hakeem Muri-Okunola (state Head of Service) among others.

For the PDP, potential candidates include Adedeji Doherty (former Lagos State PDP Chairman), Ade Dosunmu (former Director General of the Nigerian Maritime Administration and Safety Agency), and Babatunde Gbadamosi (2020 PDP Lagos East senatorial by-election nominee and 2019 ADP gubernatorial nominee) while Abdul-Azeez Olajide Adediran has declared his candidacy.

Nasarawa State 

Incumbent APC Governor Abdullahi Sule was elected to a first term in 2019 with 48.78% of the vote. He is eligible to run for re-election, but has not yet stated whether he will do so. Rumored PDP candidates include 2019 PDP gubernatorial nominee and former Akwanga/Nasarawa Eggon/Wamba Representative David Ombugadu, former Nasarawa North Senator and 2019 PDP gubernatorial candidate Solomon Ewuga, and 2015 PDP gubernatorial nominee Yusuf Agabi. A rumored APGA candidate is 2015 and 2019 APGA gubernatorial nominee Labaran Maku.

Niger State 

Incumbent APC Governor Abubakar Sani Bello was re-elected to a second term in 2019 with 58.43% of the vote. He will be term-limited in 2023 and cannot seek re-election for a third term. Rumored APC candidates include Abubakar Lado Abdullahi (House of Representatives member for Gurara/Suleja/Tafa and former House of Assembly member), Ahmed Muhammad Ketso (Deputy Governor), Sani Ndanusa (former Minister of Youths, Sports and Social Development), and Umaru Mohammed Bago (House of Representatives member for Chanchaga).

Rumored PDP candidates include Isah Liman Kantigi (2015 PDP deputy gubernatorial nominee) and Mohammed Sani Kutigi (2015 and 2019 PDP gubernatorial nominee, former House of Representatives member for Lavun/Mokwa/Edati (2011–2015), and son of former Supreme Court Chief Justice Idris Legbo Kutigi).

Ogun State 

Incumbent APC Governor Dapo Abiodun was elected to a first term in 2019 with 35.49% of the vote. He is eligible to run for re-election, but has not yet stated whether he will do so. Rumored APC primary challengers to Abiodun include Solomon Olamilekan Adeola (Senator for Lagos West, former House of Representatives member for Alimosho, and former Lagos State House of Assembly member for Alimosho II), Adekunle Akinlade (former House of Representatives member for Egbado South/Ipokia (2015–2019) and 2019 APC gubernatorial candidate and APM gubernatorial nominee), Gboyega Nasir Isiaka (2019 ADC gubernatorial nominee, 2015 PDP gubernatorial nominee, and former Governor Gbenga Daniel administration aide), and Ramoni Olalekan Mustapha (Senator for Ogun East). 

For the PDP, potential candidates include Oladipupo Olatunde Adebutu (former House of Representatives member for Remo/Shagamu/Ikenne (2015–2019) and 2019 PDP gubernatorial candidate) and Segun Sowunmi (Atiku Abubakar 2019 presidential campaign spokesman).

Oyo State 

Incumbent PDP Governor Seyi Makinde was elected to a first term in 2019 with 56.24% of the vote. He is eligible to run for re-election, but has not yet stated whether he will do so. Rumored APC candidates include former CBN Deputy Governor of Operations and 2019 APC gubernatorial nominee Adebayo Adelabu, Senator for Oyo Central Teslim Folarin, and former Chief of Staff to former Governor Abiola Ajimobi and Nigerian Communications Commission Chairman Adeolu Akande, Senator for Oyo North Abdulfatai Buhari, former Senator for Oyo South and 2019 ADC gubernatorial candidate Olufemi Lanlehin, and 2019 APC gubernatorial candidate Joseph Olasunkanmi Tegbe.

Plateau State 

Incumbent APC Governor Simon Lalong was re-elected to a second term in 2019 with 51.35% of the vote. He will be term-limited in 2023 and cannot seek re-election for a third term. Rumored APC candidates include Deputy Governor Sonni Gwanle Tyoden and Plateau Central Senator Dimka Ayuba. Rumored PDP candidates include former Pankshin/Kanke/Kanam Representative Timothy Golu and former Nigeria Immigration Service Comptroller-General and 2019 PDP Plateau Central senatorial nominee David Shikfu Parradang.

Rivers State 

Incumbent PDP Governor Ezenwo Nyesom Wike was re-elected to a second term in 2019 with 83.28% of the vote. He will be term-limited in 2023 and cannot seek re-election for a third term. Rumored APC candidates include former Rivers South East Senator Magnus Abe and 2015 LP and 2007 AC gubernatorial nominee Tonye Princewill. Rumored PDP candidates include former Rivers State PDP Chairman Felix A. Obuah, former Minister of State for Industry, Trade and Investment and former SSG Kenneth Kobani, Senator for Rivers South East Barry Mpigi, former Senator for Rivers South East Lee Maeba, former Senator for Rivers South East Olaka Nwogu, and House of Representatives member for Khana/Gokana Dum Dekor.

Sokoto State 

Incumbent PDP Governor Aminu Tambuwal was re-elected to a second term in 2019 with 49.41% of the vote. He will be term-limited in 2023 and cannot seek re-election for a third term. Some rumored APC candidates include Abubakar Umar Gada (Senator for Sokoto East), Abdullahi Ibrahim Gobir (Senator for Sokoto East), Abdullahi Balarabe Salame (House of Representatives member for Gwadabawa/Illela), and Abubakar Shehu Tambuwal (former Senator for Sokoto South). For the PDP, rumored candidates include Garba Ila Gada (2012 DPP gubernatorial nominee and Senator for Sokoto North), Manir Dan Iya (Deputy Governor), Muktar Shagari (former Deputy Governor, former Minister of Water Resources, and nephew of former President Shehu Shagari), and Saidu Umar (Secretary to the State Government and former Commissioner of Finance).

Taraba State 

Incumbent PDP Governor Darius Ishaku was re-elected to a second term in 2019 with 57.21% of the vote. He will be term-limited in 2023 and cannot seek re-election for a third term. Some rumored PDP candidates include Victor Bala Kona (former Taraba State PDP Chairman), Joseph Albasu Kunini (House of Assembly member for Lau and Speaker of the House of Assembly), and Anthony George Manzo (former Senator for Taraba North).

For the APC, rumored candidates include Emmanuel Bwacha (Senator for Taraba South), Abubakar Sani Danladi (2019 APC gubernatorial nominee and former Senator for Taraba North), and Saleh Mamman (former Minister of Power) along with others.

Yobe State 

Incumbent APC Governor Mai Mala Buni was elected to a first term in 2019 with 81.26% of the vote. He is eligible to run for re-election, but has not yet stated whether he will do so. A potential PDP candidate is 2019 PDP gubernatorial nominee Umar Iliya Damagum.

Zamfara State 

Incumbent PDP-turned-APC Governor Bello Matawalle was elected to a first term in 2019 after a court decision. He is eligible to run for re-election, but has not yet stated whether he will do so. A potential PDP candidate is Deputy Governor Mahdi Aliyu Mohammed Gusau.

References 

2023
Governors